Masahiro Oishi  (born November 29, 1968) is a Japanese mixed martial artist. He competes in the Bantamweight and Featherweight divisions.

He has competed for numerous promotions during his career, most notably Shooto, Pancrase and ZST. He is the former Shooto World Featherweight (132 lb) Champion.

Martial arts career
Oishi made his debut in 1993, in Shooto, when he faced Yoshiaki Murai, winning a unanimous decision. He would accumulate a 7-5-3- record, but earned a title shot off of a two fight win streak over Masaki Nishizawa and Yoshinobu Ota. During Shooto: To The Top 10, he faced the reigning featherweight champion Mamoru Yamaguchi. He won the fight in the first round by submission. He defended the title versus Hisao Ikeda, before losing it to Ryota Matsune through a unanimous decision.

From there Oishi moved to ZST. He lost to Hideo Tokoro in the opening of the ZST Grand Prix, which was considered an upset at the time. He would go on to accumulate a 3-3 record in ZST, avenging his loss to Tokoro.

Moving to Cage Force, he earned a title shot by beating Paul McVeigh and Tetsu Suzuki. Facing the reigning champion Takeya Mizugaki, he would lose by way of TKO in the second round.

Moving to Pancrase he made history, by becoming the first Shooto champion to fight in Pancrase when he faced Manabu Inoue. He lost a unanimous decision. He would go on to fight for various promotions, achieving a 10-9-2 record.

Championships and Accomplishments
Shooto
Shooto World Featherweight (132 lb) Championship (One time)
One successful title defense

Mixed martial arts record

|-
| Win
| align=center| 30-22-9
| Toru Fujii
| Decision (Majority)
| Fighting NEXUS vol. 22
| 
| align=center| 2
| align=center| 5:00
| Tokyo, Japan
| 
|-
| Loss
| align=center| 29-21-9
| Shunichi Shimizu
| Submission (Armbar)
| GLADIATOR 012
| 
| align=center| 2
| align=center| 4:48
| Osaka, Japan
| 
|-
| Loss
| align=center| 29-20-9
| Tatsuya Karasawa
| Decision (Unanimous)
| Fighting NEXUS vol. 18
| 
| align=center| 2
| align=center| 5:00
| Tokyo, Japan
| 
|-
| Win
| align=center| 29-19-9
| Sung Hoon Jung
| Submission (Triangle choke)
| Arzalet Fighting 5
| 
| align=center| 2
| align=center| 5:00
| Curitiba, Brazil
| 
|-
| Win
| align=center| 28-19-9
| Yong Jae Oh
| Decision (Unanimous)
| Arzalet Fighting 4
| 
| align=center| 2
| align=center| 5:00
| Curitiba, Brazil
| 
|-
| Win
| align=center| 27-19-9
| Jong Moon Bae
| Submission (Guillotine choke)
| Arzalet Fighting 3
| 
| align=center| 1
| align=center| 1:05
| Curitiba, Brazil
| 
|-
| Loss
| align=center| 26-19-9
| Cleber Luciano
| Submission (Rear naked choke)
| Arzalet Fighting 2
| 
| align=center| 2
| align=center| 1:51
| Curitiba, Brazil
| 
|-
| Win
| align=center| 26-18-9
| Junichi Hirata
| Submission (Armbar)
| GRACHAN 25 x BFC Vol. 2
| 
| align=center| 1
| align=center| 2:31
| Tokyo, Japan
| 
|-
| Win
| align=center| 25-18-9
| Hirotaka Miyakawa
| Submission (Armbar)
| DEEP 75: Impact
| 
| align=center| 1
| align=center| 1:45
| Tokyo, Japan
| 
|-
| Loss
| align=center| 24-18-9
| Takeya Takemoto
| Decision (Unanimous)
| GRANDSLAM 3: Way of the Cage
| 
| align=center| 2
| align=center| 5:00
| Tokyo, Japan
| 
|-
|-
| Win
| align=center| 24-17-9
| Jun Jun
| Submission (armbar)
| Heat: Heat 32
| 
| align=center| 2
| align=center| 2:36
| Tokyo, Japan
| 
|-
| Win
| align=center| 23-17-9
| Takaaki Ito
| Submission (rear-naked choke)
| Grachan: Grachan 10
| 
| align=center| 1
| align=center| 4:45
| Tokyo, Japan
| 
|-
| Loss
| align=center| 22-17-9
| Masakazu Imanari
| Submission (toe hold)
| Deep: 59 Impact
| 
| align=center| 1
| align=center| 1:01
| Tokyo, Japan
| 
|-
| Win
| align=center| 22-16-9
| Tomoaki Ueyama
| Submission (armbar)
| Grachan: Grachan 6
| 
| align=center| 1
| align=center| 1:57
| Tokyo, Japan
| 
|-
| Loss
| align=center| 21-16-9
| Yuta Numakura
| Decision (unanimous)
| Pancrase: Progress Tour 1
| 
| align=center| 2
| align=center| 5:00
| Tokyo, Japan
| 
|-
| Draw
| align=center| 21-15-9
| Tashiro Nishiuchi
| Draw (majority)
| Pancrase: Impressive Tour 9
| 
| align=center| 3
| align=center| 5:00
| Tokyo, Japan
| 
|-
| Loss
| align=center| 21-15-8
| Abdul Guyirbegov
| KO (head kick)
| FEFoMP: Battle of Amur
| 
| align=center| 1
| align=center| 2:46
| Blagoveshchensk, Russia
| 
|-
| Draw
| align=center| 21-14-8
| Masaya Takita
| Draw
| Pancrase: Impressive Tour 1
| 
| align=center| 2
| align=center| 5:00
| Tokyo, Japan
| 
|-
| Win
| align=center| 21-14-7
| Hirokazu Nishimura
| TKO (corner stoppage)
| Pancrase: Passion Tour 10
| 
| align=center| 2
| align=center| 3:46
| Tokyo, Japan
| 
|-
| Win
| align=center| 20-14-7
| Takumi Murata
| Submission (triangle choke)
| Pancrase: Passion Tour 7
| 
| align=center| 1
| align=center| 3:34
| Tokyo, Japan
| 
|-
| Loss
| align=center| 19-14-7
| Michael Mortimer
| TKO (doctor stoppage)
| Rize 5: Revolution
| 
| align=center| 3
| align=center| 3:47
| Chandler, Queensland, Australia
| 
|-
| Loss
| align=center| 19-13-7
| Manabu Inoue
| Decision (unanimous)
| Pancrase: Changing Tour 6
| 
| align=center| 3
| align=center| 5:00
| Tokyo, Japan
| 
|-
| Loss
| align=center| 19-12-7
| Gustavo Falciroli
| TKO (punches)
| Rize 1: Rize MMA
| 
| align=center| 2
| align=center| 2:02
| Mansfield, Queensland, Australia
| 
|-
| Loss
| align=center| 19-11-7
| Takeya Mizugaki
| TKO (punches)
| GCM: Cage Force 9
| 
| align=center| 2
| align=center| 0:57
| Tokyo, Japan
| 
|-
| Win
| align=center| 19-10-7
| Tetsu Suzuki
| Decision (unanimous)
| GCM: Cage Force 8
| 
| align=center| 3
| align=center| 5:00
| Tokyo, Japan
| 
|-
| Win
| align=center| 18-10-7
| Paul McVeigh
| TKO (punches)
| GCM: Cage Force 6
| 
| align=center| 2
| align=center| 3:13
| Tokyo, Japan
| 
|-
| Win
| align=center| 17-10-7
| Artemij Sitenkov
| Submission (triangle choke)
| K-1 HERO's: HERO's Lithuania 2007
| 
| align=center| 2
| align=center| 1:40
| Vilnius, Vilnius County, Lithuania
| 
|-
| Win
| align=center| 16-10-7
| Taiyo Nakahara
| TKO (eye injury)
| GCM: Cage Force 4
| 
| align=center| 1
| align=center| 3:55
| Tokyo, Japan
| 
|-
| Win
| align=center| 15-10-7
| Wataru Inatsu
| Submission (armbar)
| Zst: Zst 13
| 
| align=center| 1
| align=center| 2:59
| Tokyo, Japan
| 
|-
| Draw
| align=center| 14-10-7
| Kentaro Imaizumi
| Draw
| Zst: Zst 12
| 
| align=center| 2
| align=center| 5:00
| Tokyo, Japan
| 
|-
| Loss
| align=center| 14-10-6
| Sergej Grecicho
| KO (head kick)
| Zst: Zst 10
| 
| align=center| 1
| align=center| 0:31
| Tokyo, Japan
| 
|-
| Win
| align=center| 14-9-6
| Sergej Juskevic
| Submission (armbar)
| Shooto Lithuania: Bushido
| 
| align=center| 1
| align=center| 2:57
| Vilnius, Vilnius County, Lithuania
| 
|-
| Win
| align=center| 13-9-6
| Masayuki Okude
| Submission (reverse triangle choke)
| Zst: Zst 8
| 
| align=center| 2
| align=center| 0:44
| Tokyo, Japan
| 
|-
| Win
| align=center| 12-9-6
| Jin Akimoto
| Technical Submission (armbar)
| Shooto 2005: 7/30 in Korakuen Hall
| 
| align=center| 1
| align=center| 3:14
| Tokyo, Japan
| 
|-
| Draw
| align=center| 11-9-6
| Ryusuke Uemura
| Draw
| Zst: Zst 7
| 
| align=center| 3
| align=center| 5:00
| Tokyo, Japan
| 
|-
| Draw
| align=center| 11-9-5
| Eugenij Konkov
| Draw
| Shooto Lithuania: Chaosas
| 
| align=center| 0
| align=center| 0:00
| Vilnius, Vilnius County, Lithuania
| 
|-
| Loss
| align=center| 11-9-4
| Remigijus Morkevicius
| KO (punches)
| Zst: Grand Prix 2 Final Round
| 
| align=center| 1
| align=center| 3:13
| Tokyo, Japan
| 
|-
| Win
| align=center| 11-8-4
| Hideo Tokoro
| Decision (split)
| Zst: Grand Prix 2 Final Round
| 
| align=center| 3
| align=center| 3:00
| Tokyo, Japan
| 
|-
| Win
| align=center| 10-8-4
| Stephen Gillinder
| Submission (armbar)
| Zst: Grand Prix 2 Opening Round
| 
| align=center| 1
| align=center| 0:31
| Tokyo, Japan
| 
|-
| Loss
| align=center| 9-8-4
| Jeff Curran
| Technical Submission (Guillotine Choke)
| Zst: Zst 6
| 
| align=center| 1
| align=center| 0:44
| Tokyo, Japan
| 
|-
| Win
| align=center| 9-7-4
| Takahiro Uchiyama
| Submission (armbar)
| Zst: Zst 5
| 
| align=center| 1
| align=center| 4:31
| Tokyo, Japan
| 
|-
| Loss
| align=center| 8-7-4
| Hideo Tokoro
| Submission (armbar)
| Zst: Grand Prix Opening Round
| 
| align=center| 1
| align=center| 3:13
| Tokyo, Japan
| 
|-
| Loss
| align=center| 8-6-4
| Ryota Matsune
| Decision (majority)
| Shooto: 8/10 in Yokohama Cultural Gymnasium
| 
| align=center| 3
| align=center| 5:00
| Yokohama, Kanagawa, Japan
| 
|-
| Draw
| align=center| 8-5-4
| Hisao Ikeda
| Draw
| Shooto: Treasure Hunt 10
| 
| align=center| 3
| align=center| 5:00
| Yokohama, Kanagawa, Japan
| 
|-
| Win
| align=center| 8-5-3
| Mamoru Yamaguchi
| Submission (triangle armbar)
| Shooto: To The Top 10
| 
| align=center| 1
| align=center| 1:44
| Tokyo, Japan
| 
|-
| Win
| align=center| 7-5-3
| Yoshinobu Ota
| Submission (rear naked choke)
| Shooto: To The Top 2
| 
| align=center| 2
| align=center| 2:48
| Tokyo, Japan
| 
|-
| Win
| align=center| 6-5-3
| Masaki Nishizawa
| TKO (punches)
| Shooto: To The Top 1
| 
| align=center| 1
| align=center| 4:12
| Tokyo, Japan
| 
|-
| Loss
| align=center| 5-5-3
| Baret Yoshida
| Submission (rear naked choke)
| Shooto: R.E.A.D. 5
| 
| align=center| 2
| align=center| 1:48
| Tokyo, Japan
| 
|-
| Draw
| align=center| 5-4-3
| Hiroyuki Abe
| Draw
| Shooto: Renaxis 4
| 
| align=center| 2
| align=center| 5:00
| Tokyo, Japan
| 
|-
| Loss
| align=center| 5-4-2
| Alexandre Franca Nogueira
| Submission (armbar)
| Shooto: Renaxis 1
| 
| align=center| 1
| align=center| 3:11
| Tokyo, Japan
| 
|-
| Loss
| align=center| 5-3-2
| Cheyanne Padeken
| KO (punches)
| SB 11: SuperBrawl 11
| 
| align=center| 1
| align=center| 1:18
| Honolulu, Hawaii, United States
| 
|-
| Win
| align=center| 5-2-2
| Kimihito Nonaka
| Submission (armbar)
| Shooto: Gig '98 2nd
| 
| align=center| 2
| align=center| 1:18
| Tokyo, Japan
| 
|-
| Win
| align=center| 4-2-2
| Yoshihiro Fujita
| Technical Submission (kimura)
| Shooto: Las Grandes Viajes 2
| 
| align=center| 1
| align=center| 2:40
| Tokyo, Japan
| 
|-
| Loss
| align=center| 3-2-2
| Hisao Ikeda
| Decision (unanimous)
| Shooto: Reconquista 3
| 
| align=center| 2
| align=center| 5:00
| Tokyo, Japan
| 
|-
| Win
| align=center| 3-1-2
| Yoshiyuki Takayama
| Decision (unanimous)
| Shooto: Gig
| 
| align=center| 2
| align=center| 5:00
| Tokyo, Japan
| 
|-
| Win
| align=center| 2-1-2
| Katsuhisa Akasaki
| Submission (armbar)
| Shooto: Let's Get Lost
| 
| align=center| 1
| align=center| 2:12
| Tokyo, Japan
| 
|-
| Draw
| align=center| 1-1-2
| Hisao Ikeda
| Draw
| Shooto: Vale Tudo Junction 2
| 
| align=center| 3
| align=center| 3:00
| Tokyo, Japan
| 
|-
| Draw
| align=center| 1-1-1
| Kimihito Nonaka
| Draw
| Shooto: Tokyo Free Fight
| 
| align=center| 3
| align=center| 3:00
| Tokyo, Japan
| 
|-
| Loss
| align=center| 1-1
| Masato Suzuki
| Submission (armbar)
| Shooto: Vale Tudo Access 1
| 
| align=center| 2
| align=center| 0:43
| Tokyo, Japan
| 
|-
| Win
| align=center| 1-0
| Yoshiaki Murai
| Decision (unanimous)
| Shooto: Shooto
| 
| align=center| 3
| align=center| 3:00
| Tokyo, Japan
|

See also
List of male mixed martial artists

References

External links
 
 Masahiro Oishi at mixedmartialarts.com
 Masahiro Oishi at fightmatrix.com

1968 births
Japanese male mixed martial artists
Bantamweight mixed martial artists
Featherweight mixed martial artists
Mixed martial artists utilizing wrestling
Mixed martial artists utilizing Brazilian jiu-jitsu
Japanese practitioners of Brazilian jiu-jitsu
Living people